Schloss Seggau is a castle situated in the locality Seggauberg in southern Styria, Austria. It is located on a wooded hill overlooking the town of Leibnitz.

History 

The area around Schloss Seggau has been settled since at least the Roman era, as demonstrated by the impressive lapidarium which has survived from that period. The upper castle was built by the Archbishopric of Salzburg in the twelfth century as a base for missions and supervision and this original structure was expanded in 1218 by the bishops of Seckau.  Over time, a total of three castles were built: Burg Leibnitz (belonging to the Archbishopric of Salzburg), the castle of the bishops of Seckau, and Schloss Polheim. The castles were completed in their present form under Bishop Johann Ernst, Count of Thun, in the latter half of the seventeenth century. Schloss Seggau was the residence of the bishops until 1786, after which it remained their summer residence until into the twentieth century.

Schloss Seggau now serves as a site for seminars and conferences with a hotel and a "Schloss Cafe". The wine cellar is over three hundred years old and offers the opportunity for wine tastings and sales.

See also
List of castles in Austria

References

This article was initially translated from the German Wikipedia.

External links
 Schloss Seggau - official website

Castles in Styria
Museums in Styria
Historic house museums in Austria
Establishments in the Duchy of Styria